Youssouf Koné (born 28 May 1983 in Abidjan) is a Côte d'Ivoire football player. He currently plays for Latina Calcio.

Football career
Koné started his career at Internazionale. He won the youth champion in summer 2002. Like other member of the winning team, Koné was loaned to Viterbese of Serie C1.

In summer 2003, he joined Legnano of Serie C2, and moved to Castel di Sangro (Serie C2) in winter transfer window.

In summer 2004, Koné transferred to Vittoria of Serie C1 in join-ownership bid, along with Federico Piovaccari. But a year later he moved to Gela in a same deal.

In January 2005, Lucchese got the player license from Gela, re-joining former teammate Mathieu Moreau, and got full ownership in summer 2006, by bought remain half from Inter.

In summer 2010, Koné transferred to Latina Calcio of Serie C2.

External links
 Profile at Lucchese

1983 births
Living people
Ivorian footballers
Ivorian expatriate footballers
A.C. Legnano players
Inter Milan players
S.S.D. Lucchese 1905 players
Expatriate footballers in Italy
Association football midfielders
S.S.D. Pro Sesto players
F.C. Vittoria players
Footballers from Abidjan